Mills Sanerivi (born 31 August 1999) is a New Zealand rugby union player, currently playing for the New England Free Jacks of Major League Rugby (MLR) and  in the National Provincial Championship. His preferred position is hooker or flanker.

Professional career
Sanerivi signed for Major League Rugby side New England Free Jacks for the 2022 Major League Rugby season.

References

External links
itsrugby.co.uk Profile

1999 births
Living people
Rugby union hookers
Rugby union flankers
New Zealand rugby union players
Taranaki rugby union players
New England Free Jacks players